Laphria ferox is a robber fly in the genus Laphria ("bee-like robber flies"), in the order Diptera ("flies").

References

Further reading

External links

ferox
Insects described in 1883
Taxa named by Samuel Wendell Williston